The 1973 Portsmouth City Council election was held on 10 May 1973 as part of the first elections to the new local authorities established by the Local Government Act 1972 in England and Wales. 48 councillors were elected from 16 electoral divisions. Each division returned three councillors each by first-past-the-post voting for a three-year term of office.

The Conservative Party won overall control of the council.

Election results

Ward results

Buckland

Cosham

Farlington

Fratton

Havelock

Highland

Kingston

Meredith

Nelson

North End

Paulsgrove

Portsea

St. Jude

St. Mary & Guildhall

St. Simon

St. Thomas

References
1973 Portsmouth election result

1973
1973 English local elections
1970s in Hampshire